The Thailand Philharmonic Orchestra (TPO) gave its inaugural performance at the Royal Thailand Navy Auditorium on 23 June 2005, in a gala concert for the International Trumpet Guild Conference. Over its first six seasons the TPO has consistently impressed and inspired audiences with its performances. Many conductors have led the TPO including Gudni Emilsson, Claude Villaret, Delta David Geir, Leo Phillips, Michalis Economou, Jeannine Wagnar, Dariusz Mikulski, Ligia Amadio, Christopher Hughes and Jeffery Meyer.

Soloists from around the world regularly join the TPO for performances and have praised the orchestra for its growth and development in such a short period of time. Those guests have included Jens Lindemann, Lambis Vassiliadis, Boris Brovtsyn, Alexandros Economou, Tomas Strasil, Reinhold Friedrich, Cristina Bojin, Karina Di Virgilio, Mischa Maisky, Yoon Jin Kim, Jura Margulis, Christopher Espenschied, Dimitry Ashkenazy, Ara Malikian, Serouj Kradjian, Robyn Schulkowsky, Lucia Aliberti, and Otto Schilli among others.

History 
The first International appearance by TPO occurred in October 2009 when the Japanese Association of Orchestras extended the invitation to perform at the Asian Orchestras Festival in the Tokyo Opera City Concert Hall. In the same year the Royal Thai Government invited TPO to play at the gala concert for the 15th ASEAN Summit held in Cha-Am in front of 10 Prime Ministers from the 10 ASEAN countries and six from China, India, Japan, S Korea, Australia and New Zealand.

On September 29, 2010, TPO had the distinct honor to give a performance for HM King Bhumibol Adulyadej and HRH Princess Maha Chakri Sirindhorn at Royal Medical College Auditorium, Siriraj Hospital. In the concert TPO paid tribute to His Majesty’s considerable musical talent. The concert served to honor the occasion of the 37th Anniversary of a special concert that His Majesty played for students at the Royal Medical College’s auditorium on September 29, 1973.

TPO regularly performs for major national events for the Royal Thai Government, the most recent being to celebrate His Majesty the King’s 84th Birthday Celebration Concert on December 3 at Sanam Luang in downtown Bangkok.

The 2014–2015 season was Gudni Emilsson’s tenth season as Chief Conductor of the TPO. He continues the work of attracting a loyal and appreciative following in Thailand, while helping the TPO to build a reputation for performing excellence. Its annual schedule of more than 70 performances draws from over three centuries of orchestral repertoire as well as chamber, contemporary and specially-commissioned new music.

Early in 2015, the TPO collaborated with American conductor Jeffery Meyer in its international debut album, recording the complete orchestral works by renowned Thai composer, Narong Prangcharoen. The recording will be released by Albany recordings in mid-2015.

The TPO is proud to have the patronage of the Royal Thai Government and Mahidol University and enjoys a burgeoning multicultural tradition. The 95-member symphony orchestra is made up of musicians from more than 19 nations. The TPO has been active in recording many traditional Thai songs, and has produced 10 CDs of those works. In addition, the TPO has several new projects and collaborations on the horizon including recording sessions, concerts throughout Thailand, and several international performances.

Orchestra musicians
A list of the principal players of the TPO as of 2015: 
 Sittichai Pengcharoen, concertmaster
 Inga Causa, principal second violin
 Colin Wrubleski, principal viola
 Juris Lakutis, principal cello
 Maris Arents, principal bass
 Hiroshi Matsushima and Yu Jin Jung, co-principal flutes
 Cooper Wright, principal oboe
 Le Dai and Worawut Khamchuanchuen, co-principal clarinets
 Christopher Schaub and Patrawut Punputhaphong, co-principal bassoons
 Nantawat Waranich and Suparchai Sorathorn, co-principal horns
 Surasi Chanoksakul and Somjate Pookaew, co-principal trumpets
 Philip Brink and Satit Chomchewchan, co-principal trombones
 Kitti Sawetkittikul, principal tuba
 Thayarat  Sopolpong, principal percussion
 Kyle Acuncius, principal timpani

See also
College of Music, Mahidol University

References

External links
 Official website
 Facebook Fan Page of the TPO
 College of Music, Mahidol University - TPO host institution

2005 establishments in Thailand
Thai orchestras
Musical groups established in 2005
Symphony orchestras